Åshild Anmarkrud (born 22 September 1939) is a Norwegian politician for the Christian Democratic Party.

She served as a deputy representative to the Parliament of Norway from Oppland during the term 1997–2001, except for 1997 to 1999 when she was a State Secretary in the Norwegian Ministry of Justice and the Police. She has also been a board member of the Norwegian State Housing Bank from 1990 to 1997.

References

1939 births
Living people
Oppland politicians
Deputy members of the Storting
Norwegian state secretaries
Christian Democratic Party (Norway) politicians